Alicia Nicki Washington is an American computer scientist, author, and professor at Duke University. She is the author of the book Unapologetically Dope. She was the first Black woman to earn a Doctor of Philosophy in Computer Science from North Carolina State University in 2005.

Early life and education 
Washington learned how to code from her mother, who was a programmer at IBM, while growing up in Durham, North Carolina.

Washington said that at 12, she was told by her teacher that she "gave blacks a bad rep." She has also highlighted racist student reviews of her collegiate teaching referring to her as "rude" or "disrespectful".

Washington attended undergraduate school at Johnson C. Smith University, obtaining a Bachelor of Science in mathematics in 2000. She earned her Master of Science in 2002 and her Doctor of Philosophy (PhD) in 2005 in Computer Science (CS) from North Carolina State University (NC State).

Career

2006-2020 
In 2006, Washington became an assistant professor of CS at Howard University, where she was the first Black woman CS faculty. At Howard, Washington helped develop Google's "Google In Residence" program. Washington joined Winthrop University in 2015 as an associate professor of CS.

Duke University (2020-present) 
Washington joined Duke University's faculty as a professor of CS in June 2020.

Washington, along with Dr. Shaundra Daily and PhD candidate Cecilé Sadler, created the Cultural Competence in Computing (3C) Fellows Program.

In 2021, Washington and Daily were awarded a $10 million grant from the National Science Foundation to establish Duke University's Alliance for Identity-Inclusive Computing Education (AIICE).

Selected publications

See also 

 Timnit Gebru
 Khalia Braswell
 Deborah Raji
 Joy Buolamwini

References

External links 

 
 Profile at Duke University
 

21st-century American women writers
21st-century American writers
American software engineers
American women computer scientists
American women engineers
American women scientists
Computer programmers
Duke University faculty
Google people
Howard University faculty
Johnson C. Smith University alumni
Living people
North Carolina State University alumni
People from Durham, North Carolina
Software engineers
Winthrop University people
Women computer scientists
Year of birth missing (living people)